Tom Sutcliffe (born 4 June 1943) is an English opera critic, author and journalist.  He is also a current member of the General Synod of the Church of England, first elected for the Diocese of Southwark in 1990. From 2002 until 2011 he was a member of the Cathedrals Fabric Commission for England.

Early life
Sutcliffe was born in Norwich, and saw his first opera, at the age of 4, at the Kings Theatre, Southsea. He was a boy chorister at Chichester Cathedral, and became head chorister there in 1955, near the end of the period during which Horace Hawkins was Organist and Master of the Choristers.  He was educated with a choral scholarship at Hurstpierpoint College and then at Magdalen College, Oxford, where he was a tenor choral scholar and studied English literature.

His professional career as a countertenor commenced in 1964, while he taught English at what is now the Purcell School. He sang for Henry Washington at Brompton Oratory, and took singing lessons privately from Roy Hickman, a professor at the Guildhall School of Music and Drama, whose students included the tenor Ian Partridge, the contralto Ruth Little, and the countertenor Kevin Smith. From 1965 to 1969, he played an important role in the management of the pioneering early music group Musica Reservata, founded by Michael Morrow and John S. Beckett. He was responsible for the first ever large-scale concert at the Queen Elizabeth Hall involving an orchestra of authentic instruments in July 1967, as a result of which Musica Reservata was contracted to make a number of recordings with Philips Records. Between 1966 and 1970, he was the one countertenor in the choir of Westminster Cathedral (where the boy choristers also provide an alto line). He was a founder member alongside Paul Esswood, James Griffett and James Bowman of the men's voice vocal ensemble Pro Cantione Antiqua, making a series of recordings in 1970 for German radio stations conducted by Bruno Turner. Also in 1970 he made his professional opera debut at the Landestheater Darmstadt as Ottone in L'incoronazione di Poppea in a production by the Harro Dicks, conducted by Hans Drewanz using a new edition by Nikolaus Harnoncourt. In 1969 and 1970, he sang with the Concentus Musicus Wien, first as alto soloist in the Christmas Oratorio in Bremen, and then at the Vienna Festival in a Konzerthaus performance of two Bach alto cantatas. He also recorded the Machault Messe de Nostre Dame with James Bowman, and was a soloist in the first period instrument recording of the St Matthew Passion, conducted by Nikolaus Harnoncourt.

Later career
For two years from 1968, Sutcliffe sold advertising space on the magazine Music & Musicians which he edited from 1970 to 1973. In January 1975 he became music, opera and theatre critic for Vogue, and continued to review music and opera for Vogue until 1987.  Between 1973 and 1996, he worked on the staff of The Guardian, where he was first commissioned as a critic in 1972 – covering Rudolf Bing's farewell Gala at the Met, and the new Bayreuth Festival Tannhäuser staged by Götz Friedrich. After 1979, when the Guardian's famous theatre and opera critic Philip Hope-Wallace died, Sutcliffe wrote frequently about opera, eventually becoming the main opera critic on the paper until 1993 and the replacement of Edward Greenfield on his retirement as chief music critic by Andrew Clements. In 1996 Sutcliffe left the Guardian, where he had also been a frequent writer of features and had edited the arts and obituaries pages. He has continued to write obituaries for The Guardian, including most recently the obituary of Wolfgang Wagner, the composer's grandson, and in 2007 of Luciano Pavarotti. Two months after leaving the Guardian he was invited to become opera critic of the Evening Standard, replacing Alexander Waugh in a post that he held until 2002 when Norman Lebrecht joined the paper as arts supremo on the retirement of editor Max Hastings. He also wrote regularly for Opera News, among many other publications.

He contributed to the Cambridge Companion to Twentieth Century Opera and has also written for the programme books of San Francisco Opera, Glyndebourne Festival Opera, Welsh National Opera, Garsington Opera, Grange Park Opera, the Aldeburgh Festival, Opera Holland Park, La Monnaie, the Edinburgh Festival, Opera Australia, Frankfurt Opera, the Theater an der Wien in Vienna, and the Teatro di San Carlo in Naples.  His appearances on television have included a 1991 film about Benjamin Britten in the BBC's J'Accuse series. In 1994 he took an important part in Lindsay Anderson's last film, an entertaining and autobiographical documentary titled Is That All There Is?. He has twice been elected to a Leverhulme Trust Fellowship, and from 1999 to 2009 chaired the Music section of The Critics' Circle, of which he is president until the end of 2012. In 2007 he was elected an Honorary Fellow of Rose Bruford College. He worked as a dramaturg in collaboration with opera director Keith Warner at the Monnaie in Brussels in 1998 and at the Theater an der Wien in 2003 and 2006. He currently writes for Opera Now and Opernwelt.

Personal life
Sutcliffe is married to the author, playwright and librettist Meredith Oakes. They have a daughter and a son, Walter Sutcliffe, an opera and theatre director.

Publications
Believing in Opera (Faber and Faber, 1996). 
The Faber Book of Opera (Faber and Faber, 2000).

References

External links
 Tom Sutcliffe's blog

1943 births
Living people
People educated at Hurstpierpoint College
Alumni of Magdalen College, Oxford
English opera singers
Operatic countertenors
Opera critics
Members of the General Synod of the Church of England
Presidents of the Critics' Circle